Jugna Chattha also spell as Jagna Chattha is a small village located to the west of Ghari Donger Village and Ahmad Nagar Chattha town, Gujranwala District, Tehsil Wazirabad, Punjab, Pakistan. For education in the village a Government Primary School for Female Jugna Chattha is functional, by Government of Punjab, Pakistan under Board of Intermediate and Secondary Education, Gujranwala. For boys education no any facility is available in the village. Boys for primary and higher-level education, while girls for higher education go to Dilawar Cheema Khurd and Ahmad Nagar Chattha. Most of the population of the village is educated. Farming is the livelihood of the people in the village, a few people are the government employees. For Basic Essentials, People visit Ahmad Nagar Chattha like food, education, health, clothes, shoes and electricity. The only way to get to Jugna Chattha is by Road. Jugna Chattha is directly connected with Dilawar Cheema Khurd, Ghari Donger, Jham Wala and Peera Thatha, When connected with Ahmad Nagar Chattha via Ghari Donger. 100% population in Jugna Chattha is Muslim.

See also 
 Pathanke Cheema
 Kub Pora Cheema
 Ghari Donger

References 

Villages in Gujranwala District